Berliner AK 07 is a German football club based in the locality of Moabit of the borough of Mitte in Berlin, Germany. The team competes in the fourth tier Regionalliga Nordost.

History 
The association was established on 15 December 1907 in the Wedding district of Berlin as an athletics club interested primarily in running. A football department was formed in 1908 which has since remained a largely anonymous side playing in lower tier city competition. In the early 90s AK 07 played in the sixth division Landesliga Berlin and advanced to the Verbandsliga Berlin (V) on the strength of a 1995 championship there. A 1999 Verbandsliga title saw the club further promoted to the NOFV-Oberliga Nord (IV).

AK 07 merged with BSV Mitte in 2004: Mitte had earlier been formed out of the merger of the ethnically Turkish sides BFC Güneyspor and Fenerbahçe Berlin. The restructured association formed a co-operative relationship with Turkish first division club Ankaraspor in June 2006 which focuses on player development in Germany.

On 6 July 2006 the club adopted the name Berlin Ankaraspor Kulübü 07 and selected Ahmet Gökcek, son of the mayor of Ankara, as chairman. With the name change the club also abandoned its traditional colours of red and white to don the blue and white kit of Ankaraspor, but later reverted to its old name and colours.

The club won promotion to the Regionalliga Nord in 2011 and achieved a German Cup upset when it defeated Bundesliga side 1899 Hoffenheim 4–0 in 2012.

Since 2012 the club plays in the Regionalliga Nordost.

Stadium 
Berliner AK 07 played its home fixtures in the Sportanlage Lüderitzstraße (capacity 3,000) with an interlude (2000–2003) spent at the Hanne-Sobek-Sportanlage. The team has moved to the 20,000 seat Friedrich-Ludwig-Jahn-Sportpark in Berlin's Prenzlauer Berg district at the start of the 2006–07 season and currently play at the Poststadion.

Current squad

Former players

  Kemal Halat
  Ahmed Waseem Razeek

Honours 
The club's honours:
 Landesliga Berlin (VI)
 Champions: 1995
 Verbandsliga Berlin (V)
 Champions: 1999
 Berliner Landespokal
 Winners: 2010, 2012
 Runner-up: 2021

References

External links 
  
 Abseits Guide to German Soccer

 
Football clubs in Germany
AK 07
Association football clubs established in 1907
Sports clubs established in 1907
1907 establishments in Germany
Turkish association football clubs outside Turkey
Migrant workers football clubs in Germany
Diaspora sports clubs